The following is a list of Thanksgiving television specials in the United States and Canada. Unless otherwise stated, these are episodes of established television series or one-off specials that are rerun annually.

Events not specifically made for television (e.g. parades, theatrical films, unscripted sporting events) are not included in this list; professional wrestling pay-per-view specials, because they are scripted and made primarily for television, are included in this list.

Children's/family

 Adventures from the Book of Virtues: Generosity (1997)
 Alvin and the Chipmunks: Alvin’s Thanksgiving Celebration (2008)
 Amphibia: The Big Bugball Game (2019)
 Angela Anaconda: No Thanksgiving (2000)
 Animaniacs: Turkey Jerky (1993)
 As Told By Ginger: Ten Chairs (2004)
 B.C.: The First Thanksgiving (1973)
 Bear in the Big Blue House: The Best Thanksgiving Ever (1999)
 The Berenstain Bears Meet Bigpaw (1980)
 Big City Greens: Big Deal / Forbidden Feline (2018)
 The Big Comfy Couch: Feast of Fools (1993)
 Blue's Clues: Thankful (1999)
 Blue's Clues & You!: Thankful With Blue (2020)
 Biz Kid$: A Biz Kid$ Thanksgiving Special (2007)
 Bobby's World: Generics and Indians (1997)
 Bonkers: Gobble Gobble Bonkers (1993)
 Bozo, Gar and Ray: WGN TV Classics (2005)
 Bubble Guppies: Gobble Gobble Guppies! (2014)
 Butterbean's Cafe: Fairy Happy Thanksgiving / Cricket's The Boss! (2018)
 Caillou: Caillou's Thanksgiving (2000)
 Calvin and the Colonel: Thanksgiving Dinner (1961)
 The Care Bears: Grams Bear's Thanksgiving Surprise (1986)
 The Casagrandes: Cursed (2020)
 Carolesdaughter: Violent (2021)
 Casper the Friendly Ghost: Do or Diet (1953)
 CatDog: Talking Turkey (1999)
 Clarence: Chadsgiving (2017)
 Clifford's Puppy Days: Fall Feast / The Perfect Pancake (2005/2006)
 Craig of the Creek: ** Craig and the Kid's Table (2019)
 Cyberchase:
 Giving Thanks Day (2019)
 Dan Vs.:
 The Family Thanksgiving (2011)
 Daniel Tiger's Neighborhood: Thank You, Grandpere Tiger!/Neighborhood Thank You Day (2012)
 Davey and Goliath: The Pilgrim Boy (1962)
 Dora the Explorer: Dora's Thanksgiving Day Parade (2012)
 Doug: Doug's Thanksgiving (1997)
 The Emperor's New School: "Cornivale" (2008)
 Fluppy Dogs (1986)
 Garfield's Thanksgiving (1989)
 Get Rolling with Otis: The Thankful Parade / Hay Day Hay Maze (2021)
 Henry Hugglemonster: Huggsgiving Day (2013)
 Hey Arnold: Arnold's Thanksgiving (1998)
 The High Fructose Adventures of Annoying Orange: Thanksfornothing Day (2013)
 The Huckleberry Hound Show: Grim Pilgrim (1959)
 House of Mouse: House of Turkey (2003)
 Intergalactic Thanksgiving (1979)
 JoJo's Circus: The Thanksgiving Hip-Hooray Parade (2005)
 Life with Louie (Season 1, Episode 9): The Fourth Thursday in November (1995)
 Loopy De Loop: Drum-Sticked (1963)
 MAD: Bourne Leg-a-Turkey/Pilgrimm (2012)
 Martha Speaks: Martha's Thanksgiving (2012)
 Maya & Miguel: The Best Thanksgiving Ever (2005)
 Megas XLR: Thanksgiving Throwdown (2004)
 Mickey Mouse: Mixed-Up Adventures: Mickey's Thanksgiving Family Fun Race / Happy Thanksgiving Helpers! (2019)
 Mickey Mouse Clubhouse: Mickey's Thanks-a-Bunch Day (2008)
 The Mighty B: Thanksgiving Beeninactment (2008)
 Mouse on the Mayflower (1968)
 The Muppet Show (Arlo Guthrie, 1979)
 My Gym Partner's a Monkey: A Thanksgiving Carol (2008)
 PAW Patrol: Pups Save Thanksgiving / Pups Save a Windy Bay (2018)
 My Little Pony: Friends Are Never Far Away (2005)
 Pepper Ann: Thanksgiving Dad (1997)
 Pinkalicious & Peterrific: A Fairy Thanksgiving (2020)
 Planet Sheen: Thanksgetting (2010)
 The Real Ghostbusters: The Revenge of Murray the Mantis (1987)
 The Pink Panther: Pilgrim Panther (1993)
 Recess (Season 1, Episode 22): The Great Can Drive (1997) 
 Regular Show: The Thanksgiving Special (2013)
 Rocko's Modern Life: Turkey Time/Floundering Fathers (1996)
 Rugrats / All Grown Up: 
 The Turkey Who Came to Dinner (1997)
 R.V. Having Fun Yet? (2005)
 Sago Mini Friends: Happy Thankful Day (2022)
 Saturday Supercade: Q*bert: Thanksgiving For the Memories (1983)
 Shining Time Station: Billy's Party (1993)
 Skylanders Academy: Thankstaking For the Memories (2017)
 So Weird: "Earth 101" (2000)
 The Spectacular Spider-Man: Nature vs. Nurture (2008)
 Stanley: A Turkey of a Thanksgiving (2004)
 Steven Universe: Gem Harvest (2016)
 Tennessee Tuxedo and His Tales: The Romance of Plymouth Rock (1965)
 Teacher's Pet: The Turkey That Came to Dinner (2002)
 Thanksgiving in the Land of Oz (1980)
 The Thanksgiving That Almost Wasn't (1972)
 T.O.T.S.: Totsgiving (2020)
 Trolls: The Beat Goes On!: "Funsgiving" (2019)
 The Turkey Caper (1985)
 Turkey Hollow (2015)
 Underdog: Simon Says No Thanksgiving (1965)
 Wild Kratts: Happy Turkey Day (2012)
 The Wild Thornberrys: A Family Tradition (2000)
 Wordgirl: Guess Who's Coming to Thanksgiving Dinner (2014)

Arthur
 Francine's Pilfered Paper (2007)
 An Arthur Thanksgiving (2020)

Looney Tunes
 Bugs and Daffy's Carnival of the Animals (1976)
 Bugs Bunny's Thanksgiving Diet (1979)
 Daffy Duck's Thanks-for-Giving Special (1980)
 The Sylvester & Tweety Mysteries: Happy Pranksgiving (1997)
 New Looney Tunes: No Thanks Giving (2019)
 Looney Tunes Cartoons: Pilgwim's Pwogress (2022)

The Loud House
 The Loudest Thanksgiving (2018)
 The Loud House Thanksgiving Special (2022)

Max & Ruby
 Max's Thanksgiving (2004)
 Max and Ruby Give Thanks (2012)

Peanuts (Charlie Brown)
 A Charlie Brown Thanksgiving (1973)
 This Is America, Charlie Brown: The Mayflower Voyagers (1988)

Puppy Dog Pals
 Turkey on the Town / Friendship Feast (2019)
 Pups on Parade / Pop's Promise (2020)
 A Very Berry Friendship Feast / Nature Pillow Pups (2022)

Sesame Street
 A Sesame Street Thanksgiving (2018)
 See Us Coming Together (2021)

Teen Titans Go!
 Thanksgiving (2014)
 Thanksgetting (2017)
 A Doom Patrol Thanksgiving (2021)

Winnie the Pooh
 Welcome to Pooh Corner: Pooh Corner Thanksgiving (1983)
 Seasons of Giving (1999)
 A Winnie the Pooh Thanksgiving (1998)
 My Friends Tigger & Pooh: Many Thanks for Christopher Robin (2007)

Action/adventure series
 The A-Team: "Family Reunion" (1986)
 Alias: "Color Blind" (2001)
 Daniel Boone: "The Thanksgiving Story" (1965)
 The Incredible Hulk: "Homecoming" (1979)
 MacGyver: "The Outsiders" (1988)
 Mighty Morphin Power Rangers (Season 2, Episodes 48 & 49): Storybook Rangers (Parts 1 and 2) (1995)
 The Young Indiana Jones Chronicles: "Peking, March 1910" (1993)

Chuck
 Season 1, Episode 10: "Chuck Versus the Nemesis" (2007)
 Season 2, Episode 8: "Chuck Versus the Gravitron" (2008)
 Season 4, Episode 10: "Chuck Versus the Leftovers" (2010)

American drama series

 413 Hope St.: "Thanksgiving" (1997)
 The Agency: "Thanksgiving" (2002)
 Almost Family: "Thankful AF" (2019)
 American Playhouse: "The Star-Crossed Romance of Josephine Cosnowski" (1985)
 Apple's Way: "The Real Thanksgiving" (1974)
 Beauty & the Beast: "Guess Who's Coming to Dinner?" (2013)
 The Big C: "The Last Thanksgiving" (2011)
 Blue Bloods: "Thanksgiving" (2011)
 Bones: "High Treason in the Holiday Season" (2015)
 Boston Legal: "Thanksgiving" (2008)
 Boston Public: "Chapter Five" (2000)
 Brothers & Sisters: "Just a Sliver" (2008)
 Castle: "The Good, The Bad And The Baby" (2013)
 Chicago Fire: "Two Families" (2012)
 Chicago Hope: "Tantric Turkey" (1998)
 Commander in Chief: "The Mom Who Came to Dinner" (2005)
 Dexter (Season 4, Episode 9): "Hungry Man" (2009)
 Dynasty : "Shoot From the Hip" (2019)
 Flipper: "Thanksgiving" (1998)
 Friday Night Lights: "Thanksgiving" (2010)
 The Good Wife: "A Defense of Marriage" (2012)
 Hill Street Blues: "Low Blow" (1984)
 Homicide: Life on the Street: "Hate Crimes" (1995)
 House (Season 6, Episode 9): "Ignorance Is Bliss" (2009)
 I'll Fly Away: "Coming Home" (1991)
 Jericho: "Red Flag" (2006)
 Judging Amy: "The Persistence of Tectonics" (1999)
 The L Word: Generation Q: "Quality Family Time" (2023)
 Law & Order: Criminal Intent: "The War at Home" (2006)
 LAX: "Thanksgiving" (2004)
 Life Goes On: "A Thatcher Thanksgiving" (1990)
 Lipstick Jungle: "Chapter 16: Thanksgiving" (2008)
 Little House on the Prairie: "The Little House Years" (1979)
 My Own Worst Enemy: "High Crimes and Turducken" (2008)
 Ordinary Joe: "Thankful" (2021)
 Picket Fences: "Thanksgiving" (1992)
 Police Story: "Thanksgiving" (1976)
 The Resident: "Peking Duck Day" (2019)
 Reunion: "1992" (2005)
 Revenge: "Lineage" (2012)
 St. Elsewhere: "A Wing and a Prayer" (1983)
 Scream Queens: "Thanksgiving" (2015)
 Sisters: "Georgie Through the Looking Glass" (1991)
 The Sopranos: "He Is Risen" (2001)
 Spenser: For Hire: "Thanksgiving" (1987)
 Stumptown: "November Surprise" (2019)
 Third Watch: "History of the World" (1999)
 Thirtysomething: "We Gather Together" (1987)
 Trapper John, M.D.: "Thanks for Giving" (1982)
 Trauma: "Thank You" (2009)
 The Trials of Rosie O'Neill: "Rosie Gets the Blues" (1990)
 

7th Heaven
 7th Heaven: "Last Call for Aunt Julie" (1996)
 7th Heaven: "Thanksgiving" (2004)
 7th Heaven: "Turkey" (2005)
 7th Heaven: "Thanks and Giving" (2006)

American Dreams
 American Dreams: "The End of the Innocence" (2002)
 American Dreams: "What Dreams May Come" (2004)

Dirty Sexy Money
 Dirty Sexy Money: "The Country House" (2007)
 Dirty Sexy Money: "The Facts" (2009)

Dr. Quinn, Medicine Woman
 Dr. Quinn, Medicine Woman: "Giving Thanks" (1993)
 Dr. Quinn, Medicine Woman: "Thanksgiving" (1994)
 Dr. Quinn, Medicine Woman: "One Touch of Nature" (1995)
 Dr. Quinn, Medicine Woman: "The Tempest" (1996)

ER
 ER: "ER Confidential" (1994)
 ER: "Great Expectations" (1999)
 ER: "Rescue Me" (2000)
 ER: "Freefall" (2003)
 ER: "Scoop and Run" (2006)

Everwood
 Everwood: "A Thanksgiving Tale" (2002)
 Everwood: "Unhappy Holidays" (2003)

Family
 Family: "A Tale Out of Season" (1977)
 Family: "Generations" (1978)
 Family: "Thanksgiving" (1979)

Felicity
 Felicity: "Thanksgiving" (1998)
 Felicity: "Family Affairs" (1999)
 Felicity: "The Last Thanksgiving" (2001)

Grey's Anatomy
 Grey's Anatomy: "Thanks for the Memories" (2005)
 Grey's Anatomy: "Holidaze" (2009)
 Grey's Anatomy: "Somebody That I Used to Know" (2013)

Hawaii Five-0
 Hawaii Five-0: "Hauʻoli La Hoʻomaikaʻi" (2013)
 Hawaii Five-0: "Lele pū nā manu like" (2018)
 Hawaii Five-0: "Ka la′au kumu ′ole o Kahilikolo" (2019)

House M.D.
 House M.D.: "Ignorance Is Bliss" (2009)

Mad Men
 Mad Men: "The Wheel" (2007)
 Mad Men: "Public Relations" (2010)
 Mad Men: "Dark Shadows" (2012)
 Mad Men: "In Care Of" (2013)

Melrose Place
 Melrose Place: "Cold Turkey" (1993)
 Melrose Place: "The Days of Wine and Vodka" (1994)

NCIS franchise
 NCIS: "Child's Play" (2009)
 NCIS: "Sins of the Father" (2011)
 NCIS: "Shell Shock (Part II)" (2012)
 NCIS: "Grounded" (2014)
 NCIS: New Orleans: "Chasing Ghosts" (2014)
 NCIS: "Blood Brothers" (2015)
 NCIS: New Orleans: "Billy and the Kid" (2015)
 NCIS: "Enemy Combatant" (2016)
 NCIS: "Ready or Not" (2017)

Once and Again
 Once and Again: "Thanksgiving" (1999)
 Once and Again: "Feast or Famine" (2000)
 Once and Again: "Chaos Theory" (2001)

Private Practice
 Private Practice:  "The Breaking Point" (2011)Private Practice: "Georgia on My Mind" (2012)

Promised Land
 Promised Land: "The Homecoming" (1996)
 Promised Land: "To Everything a Season" (1997)

Providence
 Providence: "Thank You, Providence" (1999)
 Providence: "The Thanksgiving Story" (2000)
 Providence: "Gobble, Gobble" (2001)
 Providence: "Left-Overs" (2002)

This Is Us
 This Is Us: "Pilgrim Rick" (2016)
 This Is Us: "Six Thanksgivings" (2018)
 This Is Us: "So Long, Marianne" (2019)
 This Is Us: "Taboo" (2022)

Touched by an Angel
 Touched by an Angel: "An Unexpected Snow" (1994)
 Touched by an Angel: "Homecoming" (1996)
 Touched by an Angel: "Heaven's Portal" (2001)

The Waltons
 The Waltons: "The Thanksgiving Story" (1973)
 The Waltons: "The Waiting" (1979)
 A Day for Thanks on Walton's Mountain (1982) – TV movie
 A Walton Thanksgiving Reunion (1993) – TV movie
 A Waltons Thanksgiving (2022) – TV movie

The West Wing
 Season 2, Episode 8: "Shibboleth" (November 22, 2000)
 Season 3, Episode 7: "The Indians in the Lobby" (November 21, 2001)
 Season 4, Episode 10: "Arctic Radar" (November 27, 2002)

Teen dramas
 90210: "Smoked Turkey" (2011)
 The Carrie Diaries: "Endgame" (2015)
 Dawson's Creek: "Guess Who's Coming to Dinner" (1999)
 Degrassi: "Spiderwebs" (2013)
 High School Musical: The Musical: The Series: Thanksgiving (2019)
 Greek: "The Wish-Pretzel" (2009)
 Jack & Bobby: "Lost Boys" (2004)
 Life Unexpected: "Thanks Ungiven" (2010)
 One Tree Hill: "Between Raising Hell and Amazing Grace" (2010)
 Scream Queens: "Thanksgiving" (2015)
 The Society: "Poison" (2019)
 Trinkets: "Same Time Last Year" (2020)

Beverly Hills, 90210
 Beverly Hills, 90210: "The Kindness of Strangers" (1992)
 Beverly Hills, 90210: "Radar Love" (1993)
 Beverly Hills, 90210: "Breast Side Up" (1995)
 Beverly Hills, 90210: "If I Had a Hammer" (1996)
 Beverly Hills, 90210: "You Say GoodBye, I Say Hello" (1998)
 Beverly Hills, 90210: "What's in a Name" (1999)

Gossip Girl
 Gossip Girl: "Blair Waldorf Must Pie" (2007)
 Gossip Girl: "The Magnificent Archibalds" (2008)
 Gossip Girl: "The Treasure of Serena Madre" (2009)
 Gossip Girl: "It’s Really Complicated " (2012)

The O.C.
 The O.C.: "The Homecoming" (2003)
 The O.C.: "The Secret" (2003)
 The O.C.: "The Cold Turkey" (2006)

Party of Five
 Party of Five: "Thanksgiving" (1994)
 Party of Five: "Tender Age" (1998)
 Party of Five: "We Gather Together" (1999)
 Time of Your Life: "The Time They All Came Over for Thanksgiving" (1999)

 Pretty Little Liars 
 Pretty Little Liars: "Taking This One to the Grave" (2014)
 Riverdale: "Chapter Sixty-Four: The Ice Storm" (2019)
 Pretty Little Liars: Original Sin: "Chapter Eight: Bad Blood" (2022)

Comedy-drama

 AfterMASH: "Thanksgiving of '53" (1983)
 Baskets: "Thanksgiving" (2018)
 Crazy Ex-Girlfriend: "My First Thanksgiving with Josh!" (2015)
 The Days and Nights of Molly Dodd: "Here's a Quick and Easy Recipe for Leftovers" (1990)
 Eight Is Enough: "All the Vice-President's Men" (1978)
 Glee: "Thanksgiving" (2012)
 Greek: "The Wish-Pretzel" (2009)
 Hart of Dixie: "The Pirate and the Practice" (2011)
 Hindsight: "The Cranberries" (2015)
 Insecure: "Lowkey Thankful" (2020)
 Jane the Virgin: "Chapter Twenty-Eight" (2015)
 Kidding: "Kintsugi" (2018)
 Love Life: "Luke Ducharme" (2020)
 M*A*S*H: "The Yalu Brick Road" (1979)
 Married: "Thanksgiving" (2015)
 Men in Trees: "New York Fiction" (2006)
 Miss Match: "Jive Turkey" (2003)
 Miss Farah: "Chapter Twenty-Eight" (2020)
 Northern Exposure: "Thanksgiving" (1992)
 Orange Is The New Black: "F***sgiving" (2013)
 Parenthood (1990 series): "Thanksgiving with a T that Rhymes with B that Stands for Basketball" (1990)
 Parenthood (2010 series): "Happy Thanksgiving" (2010)
 The Ranch: "Like It's the Last Time" (2020)
 Related: "Francesca" (2005)
 Shameless: "Just Like the Pilgrims Intended" (2012)
 Sports Night: "Thespis" (1998)
 Ugly Betty: "Four Thanksgivings and a Funeral" (2006)
 The Wonder Years (Season 4, Episode 7): "The Ties That Bind" (1990)
 

Ally McBeal
 Ally McBeal: "You Never Can Tell" (1998)
 Ally McBeal: "Troubled Water" (1999)

Desperate Housewives
 Desperate Housewives: "Don't Walk on the Grass" (2009)
 Desperate Housewives: "Sorry Grateful" (2010)

Doogie Howser, M.D.
 Doogie Howser, M.D.: "Don't Let the Turkeys Get You Down" (1990)
 Doogie Howser, M.D.: "The Big Sleep...Not!" (1992)

Ed
 Ed: "Something Old, Something New" (2000)
 Ed: "The New World" (2001)
 Ed: "The Proposal" (2003)

Gilmore Girls
 Gilmore Girls: Season 3, Episode 9: "A Deep-Fried Korean Thanksgiving" (2002)
 Gilmore Girls: Season 6, Episode 10: "He's Slippin 'em Bread...Dig?" (2005)

 Supernatural/sci-fi series Amazing Stories: "Thanksgiving" (1986)Arrow: "Thanksgiving" (2017)Bone Chillers: "Frankenturkey" (1996)Buffy the Vampire Slayer: "Pangs" (1999)The Flash: "O Come, All Ye Thankful" (2018)A Gifted Man: "In Case of Missed Communication" (2011)Heroes: "Thanksgiving" (2009)Legends of Tomorrow: "Tagumo Attacks!!!" (2018)The Originals: "Out of the Easy" (2015)Quantum Leap: "The Leap Home" (Parts 1 and 2) (1990)Roswell: "Max in the City" (2000)Tales from the Darkside: "The Last Car" (1986)

Into the Dark
 Into the Dark: "Flesh & Blood" (2018)
 Into the Dark: "Pilgrim" (2019)

Smallville
 Smallville: "Rage" (2006)
 Smallville: "Ambush" (2010)

Supergirl
 Supergirl: "Livewire" (2015)
 Supergirl: "Medusa" (2016)Supergirl: "Call to Action" (2018)

The Vampire Diaries
 The Vampire Diaries: Fade Into You (2014)
 The Vampire Diaries: Mommie Dearest (2015)

Sitcoms

 2 Broke Girls: "And the Very Christmas Thanksgiving" (2011)
 3rd Rock from the Sun (Season 2, Episode 10): "Gobble, Gobble, Dick, Dick" (1996)
 9JKL: "Make Thanksgiving Great Again" (2017)
 Accidental Family: "What Is This – Thanksgiving or a Nightmare?" (1967)
 The Adventures of Ozzie and Harriet: "The Day After Thanksgiving" (1952)
 ALF (Season 3, Episodes 7 & 8): "Turkey in the Straw" (Parts 1 & 2) (1988)
 All in the Family: "The Little Atheist" (1975)
 Almost Perfect: "The Lost Weekend" (1995)
 The Ann Sothern Show: "The Thanksgiving Story" (1958)
 Archie Bunker's Place: "Thanksgiving Reunion" (1979)
 Babes: "The Thanksgiving Show" (1990)
 Baby Talk: "Cold Turkey" (1991)
 Bachelor Father: "Bentley's Double Play" (1959)
 Barney Miller: "Thanksgiving Story" (1977)
 Becker (Season 6, Episode 7): "Sister Spoils the Turkey" (2003)
 Ben and Kate: "Reunion" (2012)
 Better with You: "Better with Thanksgiving" (2010)
 Bewitched: "Samantha's Thanksgiving to Remember" (1967)
 Black-ish (Season 3, Episode 7): "Auntsgiving" (2016)
 Bob: "Mad Dog on 34th Street" (1992)
 The Bob Cummings Show: "Thanksgiving at Grandpa's" (1957)
 Boston Common: "Gobble, Gobble, Aggch!" (1996)
 The Boys Are Back: "Thanksgiving" (1994)
 The Brady Bunch: "The Un-Underground Movie" (1970)
 Café Americain: "... And Giblets for All" (1993)
 Call Me Kat: "Call Me Fancy Puffenstuff" (2022)
 Caroline in the City (Season 1, Episode 8): "Caroline and the Balloon" (1995)
 Carter Country: "Chicks and Turkeys" (1977)
 Charles in Charge: "The Loan Arranger" (1987)
 The Class: "The Class Gives Thanks" (2006)
 Clueless (Season 3, Episode 8): "Never P.E.T.A. Squirrel" (1998)
 Coach (Season 6, Episode 9): "It Came from New York" (1993)
 Common Law: "In the Matter of: Thanksgiving" (1996) - unaired
 Community (Season 4, Episode 5): "Cooperative Escapism in Familial Relations" (2013)
 Complete Savages: "Thanksgiving with the Savages" (2004)
 The Cool Kids: "Thanksgiving at Murray's" (2018)
 Cosby (Season 3, Episode 10): "Turkey Day" (1998)
 Cuts: "The Turkey Triangle" (2005)
 Cybill: "They Shoot Turkeys, Don't They?" (1995)
 Daddy Dearest: "Thanks, But No Thanks" (1993)
 Dave's World: "Death and Mom Take a Holiday" (1993)
 Designing Women: "Perky's Visit" (1986)
 Diff'rent Strokes/Hello, Larry crossover: "Thanksgiving Crossover" (1979)
 The Donna Reed Show: "Guest in the House" (1958)
 Don't Trust the B---- in Apartment 23 (Season 2, Episode 4): "It's a Miracle..." (2012)
 The Drew Carey Show (Season 2, Episode 9): "Mimi's Day Parade" (1996)
 Drexell's Class: "The Best Thanksgiving Ever" (1991)
 Ellen (Season 4, Episode 10): "Kiss My Bum" (1996)
 Empty Nest: "Thanksgiving at the Westons'" (1992)
 Evening Shade: "The Thanksgiving Show" (1991)
 Everybody Hates Chris (Season 2, Episode 8): "Everybody Hates Thanksgiving" (2006)
 Family Matters (Season 8, Episode 11): "Chick-A-Boom" (1996)
 Family Ties: "No Nukes Is Good Nukes" (1982)
 Father Knows Best: "Thanksgiving Day" (1954)
 Fired Up: "Honey, I Shrunk the Turkey" (1997)
 Flo: "A Castleberry Thanksgiving" (1980)
 George & Leo: "The Thanksgiving Show" (1997)
 The Burns and Allen Show: "Thanksgiving" (1951)
 Go On: "Dinner Takes All" (2012)
 Going Places: "The Thanksgiving Show" (1990)
 Good Morning Miami: "A Kiss Before Lying" (2003)
 Good Times: "Grandpa's Visit" (1976)
 Good Luck Charlie: It's a Charlie Duncan Thanksgiving (2011)
 Grandfathered: "Gerald's Two Dads" (2015)
 The Grinder: "Giving Thanks, Getting Justice" (2015)
 Grown Ups: "Why Can't We Not Be Friends?" (1999)
 Guys Like Us: "A Turkey Too Far" (1998)
 Guys with Kids: "Thanksgiving" (2012)
 Happy Days: "The First Thanksgiving" (1978)
 Happy Endings (Season 3, Episode 4): "More Like Stanksgiving" (2012)
 Happy Family: "Not Thanksgiving" (2003)
 Happy Hour: "Thanksgiving" (2006)
 Head of the Class: "Cold Turkey" (1986)
 Hello, Larry/Diff'rent Strokes crossover: "Thanksgiving Crossover" (1979)
 Home Economics (Season 2, Episode 8): "Two Thousand Pounds of Sand, $240" (2021)
 How to Be a Gentleman: "How to Upstage Thanksgiving" (unaired)
 I'm with Her: "Meet the Parent" (2003)
 In the House: "The Max Who Came to Dinner" (1996)
 It's All Relative: "Thanks, But No Thanks" (2003)
 It's Always Sunny in Philadelphia: "The Gang Squashes Their Beefs" (2013)
 The Jeff Foxworthy Show: "The Thanksgiving Episode" (1996)
 Jesse: "The Cheese Ship" (1998)
 The Jersey: "Thanksgiving Day" (2000)
 Joe's Life: "Parental Guidance Not Suggested?" (1993)
 Just Shoot Me! (Season 5, Episode 7): "The First Thanksgiving" (2000)
 Kate & Allie: "Thanksgiving" (1985)
 Kenan and Kel (Season 2, Episode 11): "Turkey Day" (1997)
 Kevin Can Wait (Season 2, Episode 9): "Cooking Up a Storm" (2017)
 Ladies Man: "Thanks for Nothing" (1999)
 The League (Season 3, Episode 8): "Thanksgiving" (2011)
 Less than Perfect: "Claude's Alternative Thanksgiving" (2003)
 Life's Work: "Gobbledegook" (1996)
 Listen Up!: "Thanksgiving" (2004)
 Love & War: "I Love a Parade" (1993)
 Love That Girl!: "Thanks for Not Giving" (2013)
 Maggie Winters: "Angstgiving Day" (1998)
 Make Room for Daddy: "Thanksgiving Story" (1953)
 Malcolm in the Middle (Season 5, Episode 4): "Thanksgiving" (2003)
 Mama's Family: "An Ill Wind" (1986)
 Man with a Plan (Season 1, Episode 5): "Thanksgiving" (2016)
 Married People: "The Baby Cometh" (1990)
 Married to the Kellys: "The Apartment" (2003)
 Married... with Children (Season 11, Episode 6): "A Bundy Thanksgiving" (1996)
 Marry Me: "Thank Me" (2014)
 Master of None (Season 2, Episode 8): "Thanksgiving" (2017)
 The McCarthys: "Love, McCarthys Style" (2014)
 Me, Myself & I: "Thanksgiving" (2017)
 The Michael J. Fox Show: "Thanksgiving" (2013)
 The Millers (Season 2, Episode 8): "Papa Was a Rolling Bone" (2014)
 The Mindy Project (Season 1, Episode 6): "Thanksgiving" (2012)
 A Minute with Stan Hooper: "An Old Fashioned Thanksgiving" (2003)
 Mister Ed: "Ed the Pilgrim" (1962)
 Mister Peepers: "Thanksgiving Show" (1953)
 The Mommies: "Thanks, But No Thanksgiving" (1993)
 Mr. Belvedere: "The Letter" (1985)
 Mr. Rhodes: "The Thanksgiving Show" (1996)
 The Munsters: "Low-Cal Munster" (1964)
 My Two Dads: "Thanks for the Memories" (1989)
 The Nanny: "Oh, Say, Can You Ski?" (1998)
 Ned & Stacey: "Thanksgiving Day Massacre" (1995)
 The Neighborhood (Season 1, Episode 8): "Welcome to Thanksgiving" (2018)
 The New Adventures of Old Christine (Season 4, Episode 10): "Guess Who's Not Coming to Dinner?" (2008)
 The New Leave It to Beaver: "Thanksgiving Day" (1984)
 The New Normal: "Pardon Me" (2012)
 Normal, Ohio: "A Thanksgiving Episode" (2000)
 Oh Baby: "Family History" (1999)
 Our Miss Brooks: "Thanksgiving Show" (1953)
 Out of Practice: "Thanks" (2005)
 Outsourced: "Temporary Monsanity" (2010)
 Partners: "How Long Does It Take to Cook a 22-Pound Turkey?" (1995)
 Perfect Harmony: "Thanks-Talking" (2019)
 Perfect Strangers: "Wild Turkey" (1991)
 The Pride of the Family: "Thanksgiving Story" (1953)
 Quintuplets: "Thanksgiving Day Charade" (2004)
 The Real O'Neals (Season 2, Episode 5): "The Real Tradition" (2016)
 Rodney: "Thanksgiving" (2004)
 Sabrina the Teenage Witch (Season 4, Episode 9): "Love Means Having to Say You're Sorry" (1999)
 Saved by the Bell: The College Years: "A Thanksgiving Story" (1993)
 Saved by the Bell: The New Class: "Thanks For Giving" (1997)
 Schooled (Season 2, Episode 8): "Friendsgiving" (2019)
 Scrubs (Season 1, Episode 9): "My Day Off" (2001)
 Seinfeld (Season 6, Episode 8): "The Mom and Pop Store" (November 17, 1994)
 Silver Spoons: "Voyage of the Darned" (Parts 1 and 2) (1984)
 Single Parents (Season 2, Episode 8): "Every Thursday Should Be Like This" (2019)
 Sister, Sister: "Thanksgiving in Hawaii" (Parts 1 and 2) (1995)
 Small Wonder: "Thanksgiving Story" (1986)
 Something So Right: "Something About Thanksgiving" (1996)
 Still Standing (Season 1, Episode 9): "Still Thankful" (2002)
 Suddenly Susan: "Cold Turkey" (1996)
 Sunnyside: "Too Many Lumpies" (2019)
 Superior Donuts (Season 2, Episode 4): "Thanks for Nothing" (2017)
 Thanks: "Thanksgiving" (1999)
 That Girl: "Thanksgiving Comes But Once a Year, Hopefully" (1967)
 Thea: "Mama, I'm Full" (1993)
 'Til Death: "The Courtship of Eddie's Parents" (2009)
 Titus: "The Perfect Thanksgiving" (2000)
 The Tony Danza Show: "Thanks...But No Thanksgiving" (1998)
 The Torkelsons: "Thanksgivingmesomething" (1991)
 Townies: "Thanksgiving" (1996)
 Twins: "Sister's Keeper" (2005)
 Unbreakable Kimmy Schmidt: "Kimmy Finds Her Mom" (2016)
 The Unicorn (Season 1, Episode 8):  "Turkeys and Traditions" (2019)
 Union Square: "Jack Gets a Hot Tip" (1997)
 Up All Night (Season 2, Episode 7): "Thanksgiving" (2012)
 What's Happening!!: "Mama The School Girl" (1977)
 Who's the Boss? (Season 2, Episode 9): "Thanksgiving at Mrs. Rossini's" (1985)
 WKRP in Cincinnati (Season 1, Episode 7): "Turkeys Away" (October 30, 1978)
 Woops!: "The Thanksgiving Show" (1992)
 Workaholics (Season 2, Episode 10): "6 Hours Till Hedonism II" (2011)
 Yes, Dear (Season 2, Episode 9): "Guess Who's Not Coming to Dinner" (2001)

8 Simple Rules
 Season 1, Episode 11: "Paul Meets His Match" (2002)
 Season 2, Episode 8: "The First Thanksgiving" (2003)
 Season 3, Episode 9: "Thanksgiving Guest" (aka "Thanksgiving") (2004)

A Different World
 Season 2, Episode 6: "If You Like Pilgrim Coladas" (November 17, 1988)
 Season 6, Episode 9 & 10 (two-part episode): "Faith, Hope and Charity"  (November 12, 1992)

According to Jim
 Season 1, Episode 8: "The Turkey Bowl" (2001) 
 Season 2, Episode 9: "Thanksgiving Confidential" (2002)
 Season 3, Episode 11: "The Empty Gesture" (2003)
 Season 4, Episode 8: "The Hunters" (2004)

Alice
 Season 3, Episode 9: "Who Ordered the Hot Turkey?" (1978)
 Season 7, Episode 6: "Alice's Turkey of a Thanksgiving" (1982)

All of Us
 Season 2, Episode 8: "Parents Just Don't Understand" (2004)
 Season 4, Episode 8: "My Two Dads" (2006)

American Housewife
 Season 1, Episode 6: "The Blow-Up" (2016)
 Season 2, Episode 7: "Family Secrets" (2017)

The Bernie Mac Show
 Season 2, Episode 7: "Tryptophan-tasy" (2002)
 Season 3, Episode 22: "Thanksgiving" (2004)

The Beverly Hillbillies
 Season 1, Episode 9: "Elly's First Date" (1962)
 Season 2, Episode 10: "Turkey Day" (1963)
 Season 7, Episode 10: "The Thanksgiving Spirit" (1968)

The Big Bang Theory
 Season 7, Episode 9: "The Thanksgiving Decoupling" (November 21, 2013)
 Season 9, Episode 9: "The Platonic Permutation" (November 19, 2015)

The Bob Newhart Show
 Season 3, Episode 11: "An American Family" (November 23, 1974)
 Season 4, Episode 11: "Over the River and Through the Woods" (November 22, 1975)

Boy Meets World
 Season 4, Episode 10: "Turkey Day" (1996)
 Season 5, Episode 8: "Chasing Angela-Part II" (1997)

Brooklyn Nine-Nine
 Season 1, Episode 10: "Thanksgiving" (November 26, 2013)
 Season 2, Episode 7: "Lockdown" (November 16, 2014)
 Season 3, Episode 8: "Ava" (November 22, 2015)
 Season 4, Episode 7: "Mr. Santiago" (November 22, 2016)
 Season 5, Episode 7: "Two Turkeys" (November 21, 2017)

Brothers
 Season 2, Episode 23: "Gobba, Gobba" (1985)
 Season 4, Episode 21: "Thanksgiving" (1987)

Cheers
 Season 5, Episode 9: "Thanksgiving Orphans" (November 27, 1986)
 Season 11, Episode 8: "Ill-Gotten Gaines" (November 19, 1992)

The Cosby Show
 Season 1, Episode 10: "Bon Jour, Sondra" (November 22, 1984)
 Season 6, Episode 9: "Cliff's Wet Adventure" (November 16, 1989)

Cougar Town
 Season 1, Episode 9: "Here Comes My Girl" (2009)
 Season 2, Episode 9: "When the Time Comes" (2010)
 Season 3, Episode 13: "It'll All Work Out" (2012)

Dharma & Greg
 Season 1, Episode 10: "The First Thanksgiving" (1997)
 Season 3, Episode 10: "Thanksgiving Until It Hurts" (1999)
 Season 5, Episode 9: "Wish We Weren't Here" (2001)

Dr. Ken
 Season 1, Episode 8: "Thanksgiving Culture Clash" (2015)
 Season 2, Episode 8: "Allison's Thanksgiving Meltdown" (2016)

Everybody Loves Raymond
 Season 1, Episode 10: "Turkey or Fish" (1996)
 Season 3, Episode 10: "No Fat" (1998)
 Season 4, Episode 9: "No Thanks" (1999)
 Season 5, Episode 9: "Fighting In-Laws" (2000)
 Season 6, Episode 9: "Older Women" (2001)
 Season 7, Episode 10: "Marie's Vision" (2002)
 Season 8, Episode 9: "The Bird" (2003)
 Season 9, Episode 7: "Debra's Parents" (2004)

Frasier
 Season 4, Episode 7: "A Lilith Thanksgiving" (November 26, 1996)
 Season 7, Episode 9: "The Apparent Trap" (November 18, 1999)

Fresh Off the Boat
 Season 2, Episode 8: "Huangsgiving" (2015)
 Season 3, Episode 5: "No Thanks-giving" (2016)
 Season 4, Episode 7: "The Day After Thanksgiving" (2017)

The Fresh Prince of Bel-Air
 Season 1, Episode 12: "Talking Turkey" (1990)
 Season 6, Episodes 9 & 10: "There's the Rub (Part 1)"/"There's the Rub (Part 2)" (1995)

Friends/Joey
Season 1, Episode 9: "The One Where Underdog Gets Away" (November 17, 1994)
Season 2, Episode 8: "The One with the List" (November 16, 1995) 
Season 3, Episode 9: "The One with the Football" (November 21, 1996)
Season 4, Episode 8: "The One with Chandler in a Box" (November 20, 1997)
Season 5, Episode 8: "The One with All the Thanksgivings" (November 19, 1998)
Season 6, Episode 9: "The One Where Ross Got High" (November 25, 1999)
Season 7, Episode 8: "The One Where Chandler Doesn't Like Dogs" (November 23, 2000)
Season 8, Episode 9: "The One with the Rumor" (November 22, 2001)
Season 9, Episode 8: "The One with Rachel's Other Sister" (November 21, 2002)
Season 10, Episode 8: "The One with the Late Thanksgiving" (November 20, 2003)Joey Season 2, Episode 10: "Joey and the Bachelor Thanksgiving" (November 24, 2005)

Full House/Fuller House
 Full House Season 1, Episode 9: "The Miracle of Thanksgiving" (1987)
 Fuller House: "Fuller Thanksgiving" (2016)
 Fuller House: "Cold Turkey" (2020)

Gary Unmarried
 Gary Unmarried: "Gary Gives Thanks" (2008)
 Gary Unmarried: "Gary Apologizes" (2009)

George Lopez
 George Lopez: "Guess Who's Coming to Dinner, Honey" (2002)
 George Lopez: "Would You Like a Drumstick or a Kidney?" (2003)George Lopez: "Trouble in Paradise" (2004)

Girlfriends
 'Girlfriends: "Fried Turkey" (2000)
 Girlfriends: "Porn to Write" (2004)

The Goldbergs
Season 1, Episode 9: "Stop Arguing and Start Thanking" (November 19, 2013)
Season 2, Episode 7: "A Goldberg Thanksgiving" (November 19, 2014)
Season 3, Episode 8: "In Conclusion, Thanksgiving" (November 18, 2015)
Season 4, Episode 7: "Ho-ly K.I.T.T." (November 16, 2016)
Season 5, Episode 7: "A Wall Street Thanksgiving" (November 15, 2017)
Season 7, Episode 8: "Angst-Giving" (November 20, 2019)
Season 9, Episode 8: "A Light Thanksgiving Nosh" (November 17, 2021)
Season 10, Episode 8: "Another Turkey in the Trot" (November 16, 2022)

Grace Under Fire
 Grace Under Fire: "Cold Turkey" (1994)
 Grace Under Fire: "Thanks for Nothing" (1995)

Half & Half
 Half & Half: "The Big Thanks for Forgiving Episode" (2002)
 Half & Half: "The Big Thanks for Nothing Episode" (2004)

HazelHazel: "Everybody's Thankful But Us Turkeys" (1961)Hazel: "Genie with the Light Brown Lamp" (1962)Hazel: "Hazel and the Vanishing Hero" (1963)Hazel: "A Lesson in Diplomacy" (1964)

Home Improvement
 Season 3, Episode 10: "A Frozen Moment" (1993)
 Season 4, Episode 9: "My Dinner with Wilson" (1994)
 Season 6, Episode 10: "The Wood, the Bad and the Hungry" (1996)
 Season 7, Episode 9: "Thanksgiving" (1997)
 Season 8, Episode 10: "Thanks, but No Thanks" (1998)

Hope & Faith
 Hope & Faith: "Phone Home for the Holidays" (2003)
 Hope & Faith: "9021-Uh-Oh" (2004)
 Hope & Faith: "Blood Is Thicker Than Daughter" (2005)

How I Met Your Mother
 Season 1, Episode 9: "Belly Full of Turkey" (November 22, 2005)
 Season 3, Episode 9: "Slapsgiving" (November 19, 2007)
 Season 5, Episode 9: "Slapsgiving 2: Revenge of the Slap" (November 23, 2009)
 Season 6, Episode 10: "Blitzgiving" (November 22, 2010)
 Season 7, Episode 11: "The Rebound Girl" (November 21, 2011)

The Hughleys
 The Hughleys: "Thanksgiving Episode" (1998)
 The Hughleys: "Roots" (Parts 1 and 2) (1999)
 The Hughleys: "Oh Thank Heaven for Seven-Eleven" (2000)
 The Hughleys" "One Foot in the Gravy" (2001)

The Jamie Foxx Show
 Season 1, Episode 12: "A Thanksgiving to Remember" (1996)
 Season 2, Episode 11: "Too Much Soul Food" (1997)

The King of Queens
 Season 1, Episode 10: "Supermarket Story" (1998)
 Season 2, Episode 10: "Roamin' Holiday" (1999)
 Season 3, Episode 8: "Dark Meet" (2000)
 Season 5, Episode 10: "Loaner Car" (2002)
 Season 6, Episode 9: "Thanks Man" (2003)

Last Man Standing
 Season 3, Episode 9: "Thanksgiving" (2013)
 Season 5, Episode 9: "The Gratitude List" (2015)
 Season 6, Episode 8: "My Father the Car" (2016)

Life in Pieces
 Season 1, Episode 8: "Godparent Turkey Corn Farts" (2015)
 Season 3, Episode 4: "Testosterone Martyr Baked Knife" (2017)

Living Single
 Season 1, Episode 13: "Love Takes a Holiday" (1993)
 Season 2, Episode 12: "Thanks for Giving" (1994)

The Love Boat
Season 2, Episode 10: "Man of the Cloth/Her Own Two Feet/Tony's Family" (November 18, 1978)
Season 6, Episode 9: "The Best of Friends/Too Many Dads/Love Will Find a Way" (November 20, 1982)

Mad About You
Season 1, Episode 9: "Riding Backwards" (November 18, 1992)
Season 3, Episode 8: "Giblets for Murray" (November 17, 1994)
Season 5, Episode 7: "Outbreak" (November 19, 1996)
Season 7, Episode 7: "The Thanksgiving Show" (November 24, 1998)

Martin
Season 2, Episode 13: "Thanks for Nothing" (November 21, 1993)
Season 3, Episode 11: "Feast or Famine" (November 24, 1994)

The Middle
Season 1, Episode 8: "Thanksgiving" (November 25, 2009)
Season 2, Episode 9: "Thanksgiving II" (November 24, 2010)
Season 3, Episode 10: "Thanksgiving III" (November 23, 2011)
Season 4, Episode 8: "Thanksgiving IV" (November 14, 2012)
Season 5, Episode 7: "Thanksgiving V" (November 20, 2013)
Season 6, Episode 7: "Thanksgiving VI" (November 19, 2014)
Season 7, Episode 8: "Thanksgiving VII" (November 18, 2015)
Season 8, Episode 6: "Thanksgiving VIII" (November 22, 2016)
Season 9, Episode 7: "Thanksgiving IX" (November 14, 2017)

Mike & Molly
Season 1, Episode 10: "Molly Gets a Hat" (November 22, 2010)
Season 2, Episode 9: "Mike Cheats" (November 21, 2011)
Season 3, Episode 7: "Thanksgiving Is Cancelled" (November 19, 2012)

Modern Family
Season 3, Episode 9: "Punkin Chunkin" (November 23, 2011)
Season 6, Episode 8: "Three Turkeys" (November 19, 2014)
Season 8, Episode 7: "Thanksgiving Jamboree" (November 16, 2016)
Season 9, Episode 7: "Winner Winner Turkey Dinner" (November 15, 2017)
Season 11, Episode 7: "The Last Thanksgiving" (November 6, 2019)

Moesha
Season 2, Episode 13: "Road Trip" (November 26, 1996)
Season 5, Episode 10: "Thanksgiving" (November 22, 1999)
Season 6, Episode 10: "All This and Turkey, Too" (November 20, 2000)

Murphy Brown
Season 4, Episode 11: "Mission Control" (November 25, 1991)
Season 11, Episode 9: "Thanksgiving and Taking" (November 22, 2018)

My Three Sons
Season 1, Episode 8: "Chip's Harvest" (November 17, 1960)
TV Movie: "A Thanksgiving Reunion with The Partridge Family and My Three Sons" (November 25, 1977)

The Neighbors
Season 1, Episode 8: "Thanksgiving Is for the Bird-Kersees" (November 14, 2012)
Season 2, Episode 9: "Thanksgiving Is No Schmuck Bait" (November 22, 2013)

New Girl
Season 1, Episode 6: "Thanksgiving" (November 15, 2011)
Season 2, Episode 8: "Parents" (November 20, 2012)
Season 3, Episode 10: "Thanksgiving III" (November 26, 2013)
Season 4, Episode 9: "Thanksgiving IV" (November 25, 2014)
Season 6, Episode 7: "Last Thanksgiving" (November 22, 2016)

Newhart
Season 2, Episode 6: "Don't Rain on My Parade" (November 21, 1983)
Season 5, Episode 8: "Thanksgiving for the Memories" (November 24, 1986)

Night Court
Season 2, Episode 8: "Harry and the Madam" (November 22, 1984)
Season 6, Episode 6: "The Last Temptation of Mac" (November 23, 1988)

One on One
Season 1, Episode 11: "Thanksgiving It to Me, Baby" (November 19, 2001)
Season 4, Episode 9: "Who Brought the Jive Turkey?" (November 22, 2004)

The Parkers
Season 1, Episode 11: "It's a Family Affair" (November 22, 1999)
Season 2, Episode 10: "Turkey Day Blues" (November 20, 2000)

Raising Hope
Season 1, Episode 9: "Meet the Grandparents" (November 23, 2010)
Season 2, Episode 7: "Burt's Parents" (November 15, 2011)
Season 3, Episode 7: "Candy Wars" (November 20, 2012)

Reba
Season 4, Episode 9: "Thanksgiving" (November 19, 2004)
Season 5, Episode 9: "Invasion" (November 18, 2005)

Roseanne / The ConnersRoseanne Season 2, Episode 9: "We Gather Together" (November 21, 1989)
 Season 4, Episode 10: "Thanksgiving '91" (November 26, 1991)
 Season 6, Episode 10: "Thanksgiving '93" (November 23, 1993)
 Season 7, Episode 10: "Thanksgiving '94" (November 23, 1994)
 Season 8, Episode 8: "The Last Thursday in November" (November 21, 1995)
 Season 9, Episode 10': "Home Is Where the Afghan Is" (November 26, 1996)The Conners Season 2, Episode 7: "Slappy Holidays" (November 19, 2019)
 Season 5, Episode 8: "Of Missing Minds and Missing Fries" (November 16, 2022)

The Single Guy
Season 1, Episode 8: "Sister" (November 16, 1995)
Season 2, Episode 9: "Davy Jones" (November 21, 1996)

Speechless
Season 1, Episode 7: "T-h-a-Thanksgiving" (November 16, 2016)
Season 2, Episode 7: "B-r-i-British I-n-v-Invasion" (November 15, 2017)
Season 3, Episode 6: "C-e-Celebrity S-u-Suite" (November 16, 2018)

Spin City
Season 1, Episode 10: "The Competition" (November 26, 1996)
Season 3, Episode 10: "Gobble the Wonder Turkey Saves the Day" (November 24, 1998)
Season 4, Episode 9: "The Thanksgiving Show" (November 24, 1999)
Season 5, Episode 6: "Balloons Over Broadway" (November 22, 2000)

Suburgatory
Season 1, Episode 8: "Thanksgiving" (November 23, 2011)
Season 2, Episode 5: "The Wishbone" (November 14, 2012

That '70s Show
Season 1, Episode 9: "Thanksgiving" (November 22, 1998)
Season 5, Episode 8: "Thank You" (December 3, 2002)
Season 7, Episode 9: "You Can't Always Get What You Want" (November 24, 2004)

Too Close for Comfort
Season 2, Episode 6: "Rafkin's Bum" (November 24, 1981)
Season 3, Episode 9: "A Thanksgiving Tale" (November 25, 1982)

Two and a Half Men
Season 1, Episode 10: "Merry Thanksgiving" (November 24, 2003)
Season 8, Episode 10: "Ow, Ow, Don't Stop" (November 22, 2010)

Two Guys and a Girl
Season 2, Episode 10: "Two Guys, a Girl and a Thanksgiving" (November 25, 1998)
Season 3, Episode 9: "Talking Turkey" (November 17, 1999)

Veronica's Closet
Season 1, Episode 8: "Veronica's First Thanksgiving" (November 20th, 1997)
Season 2, Episode 8: "Veronica's Thanksgiving That Keeps On Giving" (November 19th, 1998)
Season 3, Episode 7: "Veronica's Got All the Right Stuffing" (November 22nd, 1999)

Webster
Season 2, Episode 8: "Thanksgiving Show" (November 16, 1984)
Season 6, Episode 16: "Thanksgiving with the Four Tops" (January 6, 1989)

What I Like About You
Season 1, Episode 9: "Thanksgiving" (November 22, 2002)
Season 4, Episode 9: "Ground-Turkey-Hog-Day" (November 18, 2005)

Will & Grace
Season 2, Episode 7: "Homo for the Holidays" (November 25, 1999)
Season 3, Episode 8-9: "Lows in the Mid-Eighties" (November 23, 2000)
Season 4, Episode 9-10: "Moveable Feast" (November 22, 2001)
Season 7, Episode 10-11: "Queens for a Day" (November 25, 2004)

Veep
Season 5, Episode 5: "Thanksgiving" (May 22, 2016)

Animated sitcoms
 Aqua Teen Hunger Force: Season 2, Episode 21: "The Dressing" (December 14, 2003)
 Beavis and Butt-Head: Season 7, Episode Non-Canon "Beavis and Butt-Head Do Thanksgiving" (November 27, 1997)
 Dr. Katz, Professional Therapist: Season 5, Episode 18: "Thanksgiving" (November 23, 1998)
 Father of the Pride: Season 1, Episode 9: "The Thanksgiving Episode" (December 28, 2004)
 Son of Zorn: Season 1, Episode 7: "The Battle of Thanksgiving" (November 13, 2016)
 Squidbillies: Season 10,  Episode 9: "Thank-Taking" (November 20, 2016)

American Dad!
 Season 6, Episode 6: "There Will Be Bad Blood" (November 28, 2010)
 Season 9, Episode 5: "Kung Pao Turkey" (November 24, 2013)

Bless the Harts
 Season 1, Episode 8: "Mega-Lo-Memories” (November 24, 2019)
 Season 2, Episode 7: "Mega Lo Memories: Part Deux" (November 22, 2020)

Bob's Burgers
 Season 3, Episode 5: "An Indecent Thanksgiving Proposal" (November 18, 2012)
 Season 4, Episode 5: "Turkey in a Can" (November 24, 2013)
 Season 5, Episode 4: "Dawn of the Peck" (November 23, 2014)
 Season 6, Episode 4: "Gayle Makin' Bob Sled" (November 8, 2015)
 Season 7, Episode 6: "The Quirkducers" (November 20, 2016)
 Season 8, Episode 5: "Thanks-Hoarding" (November 19, 2017)
 Season 9, Episode 7: "I Bob Your Pardon" (November 18, 2018)
 Season 10, Episode 8: "Now We're Not Cooking with Gas" (November 24, 2019)
 Season 11, Episode 7: "Diarrhea of a Poopy Kid" (November 22, 2020)
 Season 12, Episode 8: "Stuck in the Kitchen With You" (November 21, 2021)
 Season 13, Episode 8: "Putts-giving" (November 20, 2022)

The Cleveland Show
 Season 1, Episode 7: "A Brown Thanksgiving" (November 22, 2009)
 Season 2, Episode 7: "Another Bad Thanksgiving" (November 28, 2010)
 Season 4, Episode 3: "A General Thanksgiving Episode" (November 18, 2012)
 Season 4, Episode 4: "Turkey Pot Die" (November 25, 2012)

Family Guy
 Season 10, Episode 6: "Thanksgiving" (November 20, 2011)
 Season 12, Episode 7: "Into Harmony's Way" (December 8, 2013)
 Season 13, Episode 5: "Turkey Guys" (November 16, 2014)
 Season 14, Episode 6: "Peter's Sister" (November 15, 2015)
 Season 18, Episode 8: "Shanksgiving" (November 24, 2019)

King of the Hill
 Season 3, Episode 7: "Nine Pretty Darn Angry Men" (November 17, 1998)
 Season 4, Episode 7: "Happy Hank's Giving" (November 21, 1999)
 Season 5, Episode 4: "Spin the Choice" (November 19, 2000)
 Season 7, Episode 4: "Goodbye Normal Jeans" (November 24, 2002)
 Season 9, Episode 1: "A Rover Runs Through It"  (November 7, 2004)

Rick and Morty
 Season 5, Episode 6: "Rick and Morty's Thanksploitation Spectacular" (July 25, 2021)  
 Season 6, Episode 3: "Bethic Twinstinct" (September 18, 2022)

The Simpsons
 Season 2, Episode 7: "Bart vs. Thanksgiving" (November 22, 1990)
 Season 12, Episode 5: "Homer vs. Dignity" (November 26, 2000)
 Season 13, Episode 3: "Homer the Moe" (November 18, 2001)
 Season 17, Episode 18: "The Wettest Stories Ever Told" (April 23, 2006)
 Season 31, Episode 8: "Thanksgiving of Horror" (November 24, 2019)

South Park
 Season 1, Episode 8: "Starvin' Marvin" (November 19, 1997)
 Season 4, Episode 13: "Helen Keller! The Musical" (November 22, 2000)
 Season 15, Episode 13: "A History Channel Thanksgiving" (November 9, 2011)
 Season 17, Episode 7: "Black Friday" (November 13, 2013)

Professional wrestling
 National Wrestling Alliance: Starrcade (1983–87, 2017–present as a WWE brand)
 World Wrestling Federation/Entertainment: Survivor Series (1987–present)
 Impact Wrestling/Total Nonstop Action/Global Force: TNA Genesis (2005–07), TNA Turning Point (2008–13)

Canadian series
 The Best Years: "Destiny" (2009)
 Darcy's Wild Life: "Thanksgiving" (2005)
 How To Be Indie: "How to Be Thankful" (2010)

Other

 Alaskan Bush People: "Clear & Pheasant Danger" (2019)
 The Ashlee Simpson Show: "Ashlee Backs Up Her Vocals" (2005)
 Conan: "The Turducken Kerfuffle" (2010)
 Edgar Bergen and Charlie McCarthy (1950)
 Glutton for Punishment: "Pumpkin Regatta" (2008)
 King of Cars: "Talkin' Turkey" (2006)
 The Lawrence Welk Show: "Thanksgiving Special" (1955–81)
 Long Island Medium: "Before the Baby" (2016)
 The Oprah Winfrey Show: "Oprah's Favorite Things" (1990s–2008, 2010)
 The Osbournes: "Get Stuffed" (2002)
 NBC News: Matt Lauer specials: "People of the Year" (2009–10), "Macy's Thanksgiving Day Parade 85th Anniversary Special" (2011)
 Newlyweds: Nick and Jessica: "The French Language" (2004)
 The Perry Como Thanksgiving Show (1961, 1965)
 Remembering Bo (2006)
 Rosie Live (2008)
 Sister Wives: "Thanksgiving: The Good, the Bad, and the Ugly" (2016)
 The Smothers Brothers Thanksgiving Special (1988)
 Soul Train Music Awards (1987–present)
 A Very Gaga Thanksgiving'' (2011)

See also
 List of films set around Thanksgiving
 List of Christmas television specials
 List of Christmas television episodes
 List of Easter television specials
 List of Halloween television specials
 List of St. Patrick's Day television specials
 List of Valentine's Day television specials

External links
 List of Thanksgiving TV Specials, TV Episodes, TV Movies, and Short Films at the Internet Movie Database

Thanksgiving
 
Thanksgiving
Television specials